Downtown North Historic District, also known as Trade Street District, is a national historic district located at Winston-Salem, Forsyth County, North Carolina, USA. The district encompasses 46 contributing buildings in a commercial section of Winston-Salem.  They were built between about 1907 and 1952, and most are one- or two-story brick buildings, sometimes with a stuccoed surface.  Notable buildings include the Beaux-Arts style former United States Post Office (1914-1915, 1936-1937) with an addition by Northup and O'Brien, Brown-Rogers-Dixson Company Building (1928), Centenary Church Education Building (1920s), Pure Oil Station, City Market (1925), and Twin City Motor Company (1925).

It was listed on the National Register of Historic Places in 2002.

References

Commercial buildings on the National Register of Historic Places in North Carolina
Historic districts on the National Register of Historic Places in North Carolina
Beaux-Arts architecture in North Carolina
Buildings and structures in Winston-Salem, North Carolina
National Register of Historic Places in Winston-Salem, North Carolina